San Cipirello (Sicilian: San Ciupirreddu) is a comune (municipality) in the Metropolitan City of Palermo in the Italian region Sicily, located about  southwest of Palermo.

San Cipirello borders the following municipalities: Monreale, San Giuseppe Jato.

International relations

Twin towns – Sister cities
San Cipirello is twinned with:
  Lucera, Italy (since 1989)

Demographic evolution

References

Municipalities of the Metropolitan City of Palermo